Giuseppe Antonio Brescianello (also Bressonelli; ca. 1690, Bologna – 4 October 1758, Stuttgart) was an Italian Baroque composer and violinist.

Brescianello's name is mentioned for the first time in a document from 1715 by which Maximilian II Emanuel, Elector of Bavaria conferred on him an appointment as violinist in the court orchestra in Munich. Soon after, in 1716, following the death of Johann Christoph Pez, Brescianello was given a post at the court in Stuttgart of Eberhard Ludwig, Duke of  Württemberg, as  director of music and  maître des concerts de la chambre. In 1717, came an appointment there as Hofkapellmeister. Around 1718, he composed the pastorale opera La Tisbe, which he dedicated to the Archduke in the vain hope that it would be listed at the Stuttgart theatre. In the years from 1719 to 1721 there arose a fierce conflict when Reinhard Keiser launched repeated attempts to obtain Brescianello's post. Brescianello survived and in 1731 even became Oberkapellmeister. However, but a few years later still, in 1737, a troubled period in the finances of the court led to the dissolution of the opera staff and Brescianello lost his position. Subsequently he dedicated himself largely to composition and this resulted in his 12 concerti e sinphonie op. 1 and some time later the 18 Pieces for gallichone (gallichone here means mandora, a type of lute). In 1744, the court's financial situation improved and Brescianello was reappointed Oberkapellmeister by Duke  Karl Eugen, in consideration of "his special knowledge of music and excellent skills". He was to lead the court and opera music until he was granted a pension in the period between 1751 and 1755. His successors were Ignaz Holzbauer and then Niccolò Jommelli.

List of selected works
12 concerti e sinphonie op. 1 (Amsterdam, 1738)
I concerti a 3
About 15 trio sonatas in various arrangements
18 Pieces for gallichon
Sinfonia a 4
various sinfonias concertanti and concertos
La Tisbe (Opera pastorale), 1717–18
Missa solenne (four voices)
2 cantatas Sequir fera che fugge and Core amante di perche

Selected recordings
Tisbe Nina Bernsteiner, Flavio Ferri-Benedetti, Julius Pfeifer, Matteo Bellotto, Jörg Halubek, l Gusto Barocco CPO 2014

References

External links
Biography at hoasm.org

Musicians from Bologna
Italian male classical composers
Italian Baroque composers
Italian classical violinists
Male classical violinists
1690s births
1758 deaths
18th-century Italian composers
18th-century Italian male musicians